Devario chrysotaeniatus, commonly called the gold-striped danio, is a tropical fish belonging to the minnow family (Cyprinidae).  Originating in China and Laos in the upper Mekong river, this fish is very rarely found in community tanks by fish-keeping hobbyists.  It grows to a maximum length of 3 inches (7.5 cm).

See also
List of freshwater aquarium fish species

References

External links
Devario chrysotaeniatus

Devario
Cyprinid fish of Asia
Fish described in 1981